is a Paralympic swimmer from Japan, competing mainly in category S6 events.

Nara was part of the Japanese team that broke the world record in the 4 x 50 m freestyle at the 2000 Summer Paralympics, At the same games she also finished fourth in the 100 m freestyle, sixth in the 400 m freestyle and finished fifth in her heat of the 50 m butterfly.  She was also at the Paralympics in 2004, where she was again part of the Japanese 4 x 50 m freestyle team that broke the world record and finished third as part of the Japanese squad in the 4 x 50 m medley. She won bronze medals in both the 50 m and 100 m freestyle, finished fourth in the 400 m freestyle and finished last in the 50m butterfly.  In 2008 she finished sixth in the 50 m and 100 m freestyle and eighth in the 400 m freestyle.

References

External links
 

Paralympic swimmers of Japan
Swimmers at the 2000 Summer Paralympics
Swimmers at the 2004 Summer Paralympics
Swimmers at the 2008 Summer Paralympics
Paralympic gold medalists for Japan
Paralympic bronze medalists for Japan
Japanese female freestyle swimmers
Living people
Medalists at the 2000 Summer Paralympics
Medalists at the 2004 Summer Paralympics
S6-classified Paralympic swimmers
Year of birth missing (living people)
Paralympic medalists in swimming
Medalists at the 2018 Asian Para Games